Ivan Tilev (Bulgarian: Иван Тилев; born 5 January 1999) is a Bulgarian footballer who plays as a winger for Arda Kardzhali.

Career

Septemvri Sofia
Tilev made his debut for Septemvri on 6 August 2016 in a match against Spartak Pleven and scoring his first goal for the team.

After the team promotion to First League on 7 August 2017 Tilev was sent on loan to Tsarsko Selo. He made his debut for the team in match against Strumska Slava Radomir on 19 August 2017. Tilev was called back to Septemvri on 1 September 2017 after a manager change in Septemvri and the return of Nikolay Mitov. Tilev completed his debut for the team on 11 September 2017 in a match against Etar Veliko Tarnovo.

International career

Youth levels
Tilev was called up for the Bulgaria U19 team for the 2017 European Under-19 Championship qualification from 22 to 27 March 2017. Playing in all three matches, Bulgaria qualified for the knockout phase.

Tilev made his debut for the Bulgarian under-21 team on 22 March 2019 during a friendly against Northern Ireland U21.

Career statistics

Club

References

External links
 
 

1999 births
Living people
Bulgarian footballers
Bulgaria youth international footballers
Association football midfielders
FC Septemvri Sofia players
FC Tsarsko Selo Sofia players
FC Arda Kardzhali players
First Professional Football League (Bulgaria) players
Second Professional Football League (Bulgaria) players
Sportspeople from Pazardzhik